May Independent School District is a public school district based in the community of May, Texas (USA).  Located in northeast Brown County, a small portion of the district extends into Comanche County.

May ISD has two campuses - 
May Jr High/High School (Grades 7–12) 
May Elementary School (Grades PK-6).

Academic achievement
In 2009, the school district was rated "recognized" by the Texas Education Agency.

Special programs

Athletics
May High School plays six-man football.

See also

List of school districts in Texas

References

External links
May ISD

School districts in Brown County, Texas
School districts in Comanche County, Texas